Damjan Daničić (born 24 January 2000) is a Serbian professional footballer who plays as a left-back for Prva HNL side Istra 1961, on loan from Dinamo Zagreb.

Club career

Voždovac
Daničić is a youth prospect of Serbian giants Red Star Belgrade, whose academy he left in 2019 and joined Serbian SuperLiga side Voždovac on free transfer. He made his SuperLiga debut on 27 July 2019 in a 2–2 draw with Proleter Novi Sad. Three months later, on 9 October, he made his Serbian Cup debut as Teleoptik defeated Voždovac 8–7 in a penalty shootout. He made seven appearances for Voždovac in the first half of the season.

Dinamo Zagreb
Due to lack of playing time, in the shadow of in-form Stefan Hajdin, Daničić signed in January 2020 with Croatian champions Dinamo Zagreb, whose academy his father used to attend during coach Otto Barić's tenure, on free transfer. He became the second Serbian player after Komnen Andrić to play for Dinamo since the independence of Croatia. The transfer sparked minor controversy in Serbia due to rivalry between Dinamo and Daničić's youth club Red Star.

He debuted for Dinamo on 27 January 2020 in Premier League International Cup against Leicester City, as the English side won 2–1. He made his Druga HNL debut for Dinamo Zagreb II on 22 February 2020 in a 2–2 draw with Orijent 1919. The first team coach Zoran Mamić gave Daničić a chance in the first team on 18 July, as he made his Prva HNL debut in a goalless draw with Istra 1961.

On 19 October, he was loaned out to Prva HNL side Varaždin until the end of the season. He made his debut for Varaždin on 23 October in a 2–1 loss to Slaven Belupo. He was returned from loan in January 2021. He scored his first goal for Dinamo II on 12 April, in a 3–1 victory over Orijent 1919. He scored his second goal on 5 May in an upset 2–0 victory over Hrvatski Dragovoljac.

International career
Born in Zagreb to Serbian parents, Daničić holds both Serbian and Croatian citizenships, making him eligible for both Serbia and Croatia national teams.

He earned his first call-up to Serbia under-21 team on 29 September 2020, when coach Ilija Stolica called him up for Under-21 Euro 2021 qualifiers against Poland and Estonia. He debuted against the latter opponent on 13 October in a game that ended in a goalless draw.

Career statistics

Club

Honours
Dinamo Zagreb
 Prva HNL: 2019–20

References

2000 births
Living people
Footballers from Zagreb
Serbs of Croatia
Association football fullbacks
Serbian footballers
Serbia youth international footballers
Serbia under-21 international footballers
FK Voždovac players
GNK Dinamo Zagreb players
GNK Dinamo Zagreb II players
NK Varaždin players
NK Istra 1961 players
Serbian SuperLiga players
First Football League (Croatia) players
Croatian Football League players